Halil Mutlu (born 1971) is a Turkish-born physician, political lobbyist and community activist living in the United States of America. Mutlu is currently serving as a board member of the Turkish American Steering Committee (TASC) and is a former chair of the Türken Foundation which is thought to be closely tied to and probably sponsored by the Turkish Government. His father Kemal is the uncle of Recep Tayyip Erdoğan which makes Mutlu a cousin of Turkey's current  leader. Mutlu has met with former US Vice President Mike Pence and retired Army Lt. Gen. and former US national security advisor Michael T. Flynn.

Halil Mutlu was born in Güneysu in 1971 and grew up in Turkey. He attended Medical School at Selçuk University in the city of Konya in the Central Anatolia Region of Turkey and after graduation became an emergency physician. While staying in the United States for an academic visit, he became a licensed physician, was allowed to practice in the US and specialized in internal medicine at University of Massachusetts Medical School. Mutlu is working at the Baystate Medical Center in Springfield Massachusetts since 2010.

Political Activities 
In July 2016, immediately in the aftermath of the coup attempt in Turkey, Mutlu drove to Saylorsburg with a carload of friends and participated in a protest outside the residency of preacher and political figure Fethullah Gülen who he accused of being behind the coup attempt – a claim which is strongly doubted by US officials and international intelligence experts and could not be backed by evidence.

References

Living people
1971 births
Erdoğan family
People from Güneysu